The Pratt Graphic Art Center also called the Pratt Graphics Center  was a print workshop and gallery in New York. The Center grew out of Margaret Lowengrund's Contemporaries Graphic Art Centre. In 1956 Fritz Eichenberg became the Center's director, serving until 1972 . (Sources disagree on whether Lowengrund or Eichenberg should be considered the founder of the Pratt Graphic Art Center, with most claiming Eichenberg was the founder.) The Center was associated with the Pratt Institute, providing a space specifically for printmaking. It was used by both students and established artists including Jim Dine, Robert Motherwell, Barnett Newman, and Claes Oldenburg. The Center also published a journal, the Artist's Proof edited by Eichenberg and Andrew Stasik, and had an exhibition space. The Pratt Graphic Art Center closed in 1986.

The National Gallery of Art in Washington, DC has collected prints published by the Pratt Graphic Art Center. Artists represented in this collection include

References

Further reading
A Wee Plug for a Worth Cause; All About the Pratt Graphic Art Center And an Art Sale by John Canaday, New York Times, January 5, 1964, Section X, Page 19
Artist's Proof: A Collectors' Edition of the First Eight Issues of the Distinguished Journal of Prints and Printmaking edited by Fritz Eichenberg, 1971, Pratt/NYGS, 

Printmaking groups and organizations
1953 establishments in New York (state)
1986 disestablishments in New York (state)
Small press publishing companies